Ihor Honchar (born 10 January 1993) is a Ukrainian professional footballer who plays as a defender for Mynai.

Career
Honchar is a product of the FC Bukovyna and RVUFK Kyiv youth sportive schools and signed a contract with FC Obolon Kyiv in the Ukrainian Premier League in 2011.

He was called up to play for the 23-man squad of the Ukraine national under-21 football team by trainer Serhiy Kovalets in the Commonwealth of Independent States Cup in January 2014.

References

External links
 
 

1993 births
Living people
Ukrainian footballers
Association football defenders
Piddubny Olympic College alumni
FC Dynamo Khmelnytskyi players
FC Shakhtar-3 Donetsk players
FC Hoverla Uzhhorod players
FK Senica players
FC Vorskla Poltava players
FC Hirnyk-Sport Horishni Plavni players
FC Lviv players
FC Alashkert players
FC Pyunik players
FC Mynai players
Ukrainian Premier League players
Ukrainian First League players
Ukrainian Second League players
Slovak Super Liga players
Ukrainian expatriate footballers
Expatriate footballers in Slovakia
Ukrainian expatriate sportspeople in Slovakia
Expatriate footballers in Armenia
Ukrainian expatriate sportspeople in Armenia
Ukraine under-21 international footballers
Sportspeople from Chernivtsi